The 1990 Mississippi State Bulldogs football team represented Mississippi State University during the 1990 NCAA Division I-A football season. Head coach Rockey Felker was fired after the season, the Bulldogs' fourth consecutive losing season.

Schedule

References

Mississippi State
Mississippi State Bulldogs football seasons
Mississippi State Bulldogs football